The Eye of Shinjuku is a sculpture by Yoshiko Miyashita, installed in Shinjuku Station, in Tokyo, Japan. The 1969 sculpture is below the Subaru Building, and has been described as "the most eye-catching piece of public art in town".

References

1969 establishments in Japan
1969 sculptures
Buildings and structures in Shinjuku
Public art in Japan
Sculptures in Japan